is a Japanese former professional baseball pitcher.  He pitched for the Hanshin Tigers of Nippon Professional Baseball (NPB) and the Chicago Cubs and Texas Rangers of Major League Baseball (MLB).

Fujikawa pitched in the 2006 and 2009 World Baseball Classics as well as the 2008 Beijing Olympics. A prototypical power pitcher, Fujikawa is said to have one of the most explosive fastballs in all of Japanese professional baseball and is one of Japan's premier relievers.

Early life and high school career
Fujikawa was born in Kōchi, Kōchi, in 1980, a member of the so-called Matsuzaka Generation. His name "Kyuji" literally means "baseball kid" in Japanese, and is often used as part of the phrase "Kōkō-kyuji" (高校球児) to refer to a high school baseball player. It was reportedly given to him by his father because he had thrown a no-hitter in a sandlot baseball game the day before Fujikawa was born. He began playing baseball for the Little League team "Kodakasa White Wolf", first as a shortstop, then later as a pitcher.

Fujikawa went on to Kochi Commercial High School, where he both pitched and played right field in the 79th National High School Baseball Championship in his second year (the equivalent of eleventh grade in the United States). His older brother, Junichi, was the team's starting catcher. While his team lost in the second round to Heian High School, Fujikawa clocked  in the regional Kochi Tournament and had been regarded as one of the better high school prospects in the prefecture.

Professional career

Hanshin Tigers

Early years: 1999–2003
Fujikawa's rookie season was uneventful, his perhaps most humorous moment of 1999 occurring during Spring training when he was forced to miss part of the team's workouts to attend remedial classes at his high school because his grades had been so poor. It was a unique situation made possible by the fact that the Tigers' Spring training site, Aki, happened to be close to the city of Kochi where Fujikawa's high school was located.

Fujikawa was called up to the ichigun (Japanese equivalent of "major league") team for the first time the following year (2000), coming on in relief in the Tigers' season opener against the BayStars on March 31 in his professional debut. He saw his first start in his fourth season, 2002, taking the mound against the BayStars on July 21 but lasting just four innings (he gave up two runs). He earned his first career win on September 11, holding the Yakult Swallows to one run over eight innings, finishing the season with a 1-5 record and a 3.71 ERA. However, while the Tigers had hoped that he would blossom as a starter and used him exclusively in that role that season, his career numbers up until 2003 were largely unspectacular.

2004
Relegated to the nigun team ("minor league" or "farm team") with a shoulder injury, Fujikawa decided to take the advice of pitching coach Takashi Yamaguchi and rebuild his mechanics from scratch in May 2004. Fujikawa was called up the ichigun team in the second half of the season, eager to live up to pitching coach Kiyooki Nakanishi's expectations that he would be more effective as a middle reliever than as a starter, and appeared in 26 games, striking out 35 in 31 innings with a 2.61 ERA.

2005
The 2005 season was a breakout year in every sense for Fujikawa, who became a setup pitcher for the Tigers along with hard-throwing left-hander Jeff Williams. He, Williams and then-closer Tomoyuki Kubota formed one of the most formidable relief pitching trios in Japan, even earning themselves the nickname JFK ("Jeff", "Fujikawa", "Kubota"). He earned the Central League Most Valuable Player award for the month of June and received the most fan votes for Central League relief pitcher (excluding closers) for the NPB All-Star Game. He recorded his first career save on September 9 against the Hiroshima Toyo Carp.

Fujikawa played an integral role in the Tigers' league title that year, striking out 139 in 92 innings for a 13.55 strikeout rate and holding opposing teams to a 1.36 ERA. He set a new NPB record for games pitched in a single season with 79 on September 29 against the Yomiuri Giants (Kazuhisa Inao and Tsuyoshi Kikuchihara were tied for the previous record of 78) and extending it to 80 in his last appearance of the season on October 2. He also led the league with 46 holds, winning the Central League Most Valuable Setup Pitcher award and even garnering MVP consideration (teammate and cleanup hitter Tomoaki Kanemoto eventually won the award).

2006
In 2006, Fujikawa was named to the Japanese national team to play in the inaugural World Baseball Classic. He began the regular season as the Tigers' eighth-inning setup man, but was promoted to closer when Kubota missed playing time due to injury in June. He set a new NPB record for consecutive games pitched without allowing a run on July 5 against the BayStars with 35 (Kiyoshi Toyoda held the previous record) and set a franchise record for most consecutive scoreless innings pitched on July 11 (320-win pitcher Masaaki Koyama held the previous record of 47). His streaks stopped at 38 and 47, respectively, when he gave up a run in a game against the Carp on July 12.

Fujikawa was named to the Central League All-Star team for the second straight year, commenting before the All-Star Series that he wanted to "create a baseball world like the one you see in comic books." He came on in relief in Game 1 (held July 21) at Meiji Jingu Stadium, playfully indicating to then-Seibu Lions slugger Alex Cabrera that he would throw nothing but fastballs by showing him his grip from the mound. He then proceeded to strike out Cabrera (on four pitches, a ball followed by three swing-and-misses) as well as then-Hokkaido Nippon Ham Fighters first baseman Michihiro Ogasawara (after he fouled off several pitches). In Game 2, held at Sun Marine Stadium Miyazaki on July 23, he again came on in relief, striking out Orix Buffaloes slugger Kazuhiro Kiyohara swinging and causing Kiyohara to remark after the game, "I give up... he was throwing a fireball out there."

That season, the Central League had become a two-way race for the league title between the Tigers and the Chunichi Dragons by July. However, the Tigers struggled after the All-Star break, so much so that the Dragons had built up a nine-game lead in the standings by late August. The Tigers were subject to widespread criticism from their fans when they were swept by the Dragons in a head-to-head three-game series that month. Fujikawa, who had been scratched from the roster since August 12 due to a neck injury, returned to the team on August 27, taking the mound in the eighth inning against the Giants and getting the win. He shed tears in his post-game interview, saying to fans, "Please understand that we players are giving it everything we've got."

Fujikawa appeared in 63 games that year, striking out 122 in 79 innings (for a strikeout rate of 13.84) with a meagre 0.68 ERA. He led the league in holds for the second straight year with 30 despite also recording 17 saves as the closer in the latter half of the season.

2007
Fujikawa was officially appointed the team's closer for the start of the 2007 season. He was consistent throughout the season, making his third consecutive All-Star appearance (striking out two and closing the game for the Central League team in Game 1) and recorded his 100th strikeout of the season on September 7 in a game against the Giants, the first time a pitcher had ever recorded 100 strikeouts as a reliever in three consecutive seasons in Japan. During the Tigers' 10-game win streak in the second half of the season, he pitched in all 10 games, setting a Central League record for most consecutive games pitched and earning two wins and seven saves (with a 1.80 ERA) in that span. Fujikawa recorded his 46th save in the Tigers' last game of the season on October 3, tying the NPB record for saves in a single season and leading the league (along with Dragons closer Hitoki Iwase, who also recorded 46 that year) in that category for the first time. He put up a 5–5 record in 71 appearances with a 1.63 ERA, striking out 115 in 83 innings.

2008
Fujikawa continued to dominate hitters in 2008, setting a franchise record for consecutive save conversions (11) to begin the season and racking up 30 by the All-Star break. He was chosen to the Japanese national team to play in the 2008 Beijing Olympics and named one of the team's three closers (along with Iwase and then-Giants right-hander Koji Uehara). However, Fujikawa gave up the tying run after coming on in the seventh inning of the semi-finals against South Korea, failing to lead the team to a medal.

Fujikawa pitched well after returning to the Tigers despite often being called on to pitch two innings or when the game was tied. He recorded his 100th career save against the BayStars on September 25, finishing the year with an 8–1 record, 38 saves (second to only Giants closer Marc Kroon), 90 strikeouts and a career-best 0.67 ERA in 67 innings (63 appearances).

2009
Fujikawa was named to the national team to play in the World Baseball Classic in 2009, his second time playing in the tournament. However, though he did not allow a run in his four appearances in the first or second rounds, Fujikawa allowed an inordinate number of baserunners and struggled with his fastball velocity.  Manager Tatsunori Hara opted to appoint Yu Darvish the closer for the semi-finals and finals instead of Fujikawa, declining to use Fujikawa at all in Japan's last two games of the tournament.

Despite this, Fujikawa found a way to contribute to the team, providing Darvish (who had no prior experience as a closer) advice regarding how a closer was to mentally and physically prepare himself prior to games. He vehemently denied reports by the media that he would no longer play for the national team because he was dissatisfied by the way he was used, saying, "I have never said anything to that effect."

Fujikawa saw limited appearances the first month of the regular season, going 1–0 with two saves and a 1.29 ERA but pitching in only five games in all of April (the Tigers played few games in which they held a small lead in the late innings). He gave up a game-winning home run to 20-year-old shortstop Hayato Sakamoto in a game against the Giants on May 2, incurring his first loss of the year. The Tigers suffered another blow when Fujikawa reported pain in his right elbow and had to be removed from the active roster the following day. Though he returned to the ichigun team on May 13, he was charged with his second loss of the young season when he gave up a game-winning RBI double to Carp first baseman Kenta Kurihara that very day.

Chicago Cubs
On December 2, 2012, Fujikawa agreed to terms on a two-year contract with a vesting option for a third year with the Chicago Cubs.

On April 1, 2013, Fujikawa made his MLB debut. He struggled early on in the season, allowing six earned runs in 6.1 innings pitched. This led to him spending time on the disabled list due to an arm injury. He returned to the Cubs roster on May 10, but on May 27, Fujikawa suffered an elbow injury in the 9th inning in a game against the Cincinnati Reds.  An MRI revealed that there was a ruptured UCL in his right elbow, knocking Fujikawa out for the season. He underwent Tommy John surgery on June 11, and missed the start of the 2014 season. Fujikawa made his season debut in August 2014, he made 15 appearances for the Cubs in 2014. His 2015 club option was declined by the Cubs on October 30, 2014.

Texas Rangers
On December 12, 2014, Fujikawa agreed to a one-year deal with the Texas Rangers. He was released on May 22, 2015.

Kochi Fighting Dogs
After being released by the Texas Rangers, Fujikawa's former NPB team the Hanshin Tigers reached out to Fujikawa about a reunion. However he instead chose to pitch for his hometown team, the Kochi Fighting Dogs of the Shikoku Island League.

Return to Hanshin Tigers
On November 14, 2015, Fujikawa agreed to a two-year, 300-million-yen deal to return to the Hanshin Tigers.

On August 31, 2020, Fujikawa announced he would retire at the conclusion of the 2020 season, and next day, he held press conference. He pitched a scoreless inning in his final game on November 10, 2020.

Pitching style
Listed at 6 ft 0 in and 190 lb, Fujikawa is a slender right-handed pitcher with a conventional overhand delivery. He hesitates momentarily after raising his left leg and loading his hips, a trait seen in many Japanese pitchers.

Though he has come to use his respectable repertoire of offspeed pitches more often in recent years, he is best known for his four-seam fastball.

Fastball
His fastball velocity is down a bit from his peak years, but he will still sit 91-93 mph and touch 95-96 mph on occasion.

While there are other pitchers in both Japanese professional baseball (Kroon, Kubota) and the major leagues that throw harder than Fujikawa on a consistent basis in terms of absolute velocity, Fujikawa's fastball is most notable for the late life at the end of its trajectory (akin to that of Philadelphia Phillies closer Jonathan Papelbon) that makes it appear to "hop" in front of hitters and seem faster than radar gun readings would suggest. That hitters are frequently seen swinging and missing high fastballs by a distance of two to three balls even when they clearly end up caught out of the strike zone is a testament to how much the pitch appears to "jump" at them in front of the plate.

On March 23, 2008, following an exhibition game between the Tigers and the Oakland Athletics held at Tokyo Dome in which he struck out swinging against Fujikawa, then Oakland Athletics outfielder Jeff Fiorentino commented that Fujikawa's fastball was similar in nature to the fastball of (then-teammate) Rich Harden.

Scientific studies
On November 23, 2006, major Japanese television network TV Asahi aired a short documentary on Fujikawa's fastball as part of a series on professional baseball on its popular news program "Hōdō Station" (報道ステーション). Through the use of specialized high speed cameras, it found that while the average four-seam fastball spins 37 times per second during its trajectory to the plate, Fujikawa's fastball spun 45 times per second (2700 rpm), more than either Daisuke Matsuzaka's (37) or Marc Kroon's (41). Moreover, they also found that while the spin axis of the average four-seam fastball is tilted approximately 30 degrees relative to its direction (trajectory) to the plate, the spin axis of Fujikawa's was only five degrees (Matsuzaka's and Kroon's were 10).

According to the principles of the Magnus effect, the faster an object spins and the less it is tilted about its vertical axis, the more lift it will create, causing the ball to travel in a trajectory more closely modeling a straight line than a typical fastball would. The program hypothesized that Fujikawa's fastball, if thrown from an identical release point at exactly the same target, would cross home plate a full  higher than the average fastball. They concluded that was one possible explanation for why hitters felt Fujikawa's fastball appeared to "rise" as it approached the plate.

Secondary pitches
In addition to the fastball, Fujikawa also throws an effective forkball as well as a curveball, relying primarily on these two pitches to keep batters off-balance. (He also has a cutter and a changeup that he rarely uses in game situations.) While the overwhelming majority of Fujikawa's pitches were fastballs when he first made a name for himself as a reliever in 2004 to 2006, often going entire innings without throwing a single offspeed pitch, he has since incorporated a larger share of forkballs and curveballs to reduce fatigue and possible injury over time.

Entrance music
It has become customary for "every little thing every precious thing", a song by a Japanese rock band Lindberg, to be played over the public address system when Fujikawa enters home games (including interleague) at Koshien Stadium or Kyocera Dome Osaka. Many Tigers fans can be seen waving their megaphones and thundersticks to the beat of the music and singing along as the song is played. Fujikawa has said that the song has had special meaning for him and his wife since before they got married.

See also
List of Major League Baseball players from Japan

References

External links

Career statistics - NPB.jp

1980 births
Living people
Arizona League Cubs players
Baseball people from Kōchi Prefecture
Baseball players at the 2008 Summer Olympics
Chicago Cubs players
Frisco RoughRiders players
Hanshin Tigers players
Iowa Cubs players
Japanese expatriate baseball players in the United States
Kane County Cougars players
Kōchi Fighting Dogs players
Major League Baseball pitchers
National baseball team players
Nippon Professional Baseball pitchers
Olympic baseball players of Japan
People from Kōchi, Kōchi
Round Rock Express players
Tennessee Smokies players
Texas Rangers players
2006 World Baseball Classic players
2009 World Baseball Classic players